For the Sake of the Call is the fourth album released by contemporary Christian music singer Steven Curtis Chapman. The album was released in 1990 by Sparrow Records.

It won the 1992 Grammy Award for Best Pop/Contemporary Gospel Album and the Gospel Music Association award as Pop/Contemporary Album of the Year and was RIAA-certified as Gold on December 6, 1994.

Track listing
All songs written by Steven Curtis Chapman, except where noted.
 "For the Sake of the Call" – 5:29
 "What Kind of Joy" – 4:36
 "Busy Man" – 4:28
 "Lost In the Shadow"(Chapman, James Isaac Elliot) – 5:00
 "Higher Ways"(Chapman, Phil Naish) – 4:20
 "Blind Lead the Blind"(Chapman, Geoff Moore) – 4:46
 "You Know Better"(Chapman, Bob Sauer) – 3:43
 "When You Are a Soldier" – 3:34
 "No Better Place"(Chapman, Naish) – 3:50
 "Show Yourselves to Be" – 4:26
 "For the Sake of the Call" (reprise) – 1:15

Personnel 

 Steven Curtis Chapman – lead vocals, acoustic guitar, mandolin, backing vocals (2–7, 9, 10), electric guitar (3), classical guitar (5)
 Phil Naish – keyboards (1–6, 8, 9)
 Dann Huff – electric guitars (1–6, 9)
 Jackie Street – bass (1–6, 9)
 Craig Nelson – acoustic bass (7)
 Paul Leim – drums (1–7, 9)
 Chris McDonald – trombone (2, 6), horn arrangements (2, 6)
 Barry Green – trombone (2, 6)
 Mike Haynes – trumpet (2, 6)
 George Tidwell – trumpet (2, 6)
 Don Wyrtzen – string arrangements and conductor (5, 8, 10, 11)
 Carl Gorodetzsky – string leader (5, 8, 10, 11)
 The Nashville String Machine – strings (5, 8, 10, 11)
 Christ Church Choir – choir (1)
 Herb Chapman – backing vocals (2–7, 9, 10)
 Chris Rodriguez – backing vocals (2–7, 9, 10)
 Bob Sauer – backing vocals (7), whistle (7)
 Brent Lamb – backing vocals (9)

Production 

 Phil Naish – producer
 Peter York – executive producer
 Ronnie Brookshire – recording
 Jim DeMain – assistant engineer
 Patrick Kelly – assistant engineer
 Patrick Hutchinson – assistant engineer
 Gary Paczosa – assistant engineer
 Ed Simonton – assistant engineer
 Carry Summers – assistant engineer
 Nightingale – studio
 OmniSound – studio
 Digital Recorders – studio
 Hummingbird – studio
 Treasure Isle, Nashville, Tennessee – studio
 Jeff Balding – mixing
 John Hurley – mix assistant
 Digital Recorders – mixing location
 Doug Sax – mastering
 The Mastering Lab, Los Angeles, California – mastering location
 Cindy Wilt – production manager
 Barbara Hearn – art direction
 Nick Newton – design
 Alan Dockery – photography

References 

Steven Curtis Chapman albums
1990 albums
Grammy Award for Best Pop/Contemporary Gospel Album